Majika is a 2006 Philippine television drama fantasy series broadcast by GMA Network. Directed by Mac Alejandre and Eric Quizon, it stars Angel Locsin and Dennis Trillo. It premiered on March 20, 2006 on the network's Telebabad line up. The series concluded on September 29, 2006 with a total of 138 episodes. It was replaced by Atlantika in its timeslot.

The series is streaming online on YouTube.

Premise
Sabina is the eldest child of Garam and Ayessa, who both fled from Saladin to escape from Balkan, a dark magician. Sabina’s life is shattered when her parents and siblings are abducted and brought to Saladin. She will eventually find her way to Saladin with the help of Eloida and Argo who will train her into becoming a magician.

Cast and characters

Lead cast
 Angel Locsin as Sabina
 Dennis Trillo as Argo

Supporting cast
 Carmina Villaroel as Ayessa / Linda
 Zoren Legaspi as Garam / Manuel
 Rainier Castillo as Jimboy / Erastus
 Ryza Cenon as Sara / Pria
 Eddie Garcia as Markadan
 Jean Garcia as Eloida
 Katrina Halili as Juno
 Eddie Gutierrez as Balkan
 Jaime Fabregas as Aduro
 Nanding Josef as Malko
 Spanky Manikan as Carab
 Gabe Mercado as Dibin
 Valerie Concepcion as Naryan
 Sheena Halili as Lyness
 Jade Lopez as Amyla
 Nicole Anderson as Lyjah
 Ehra Madrigal as Vynah
 Nikki Lirag as Salye
 Gina Alajar as Adana
 Polo Ravales as Ebrio
 Bearwin Meily as Bodyal
 Jake Cuenca as Terman
 Gene Padilla as Magil
 Mel Kimura as Besay

Guest cast
 Ella Cruz as young Sabina
 Miguel Villarreal Aguila as young Argo
 Renz Juan as young Juno / Janus
 Miguel Tanfelix as young Jimboy
 Sandy Talag as young Sara
 Jodell Stasic as young Ebrio
 Darryl Lelis as young Termam
 Dwight Gaston as Orbal
 Viviene Dela Cruz as Sulah
 Mikee Cojuangco-Jaworski as Tamara
 Oyo Boy Sotto as Hamir
 Toby Alejar as Larius
 Shamaine Centenera-Buencamino as Losaya

References

External links
 
 

2006 Philippine television series debuts
2006 Philippine television series endings
Fantaserye and telefantasya
Filipino-language television shows
GMA Network drama series